A1 Team Pakistan is the Pakistani team of A1 Grand Prix, an international racing series.

Management 
In 2008/2009 season, the team is being run by Team Craft, bringing a high level of knowledge and expertise to A1 Team Pakistan. 
Previously, A1 Team Pakistan was run by Super Nova Racing and Performance Racing. In 2019, United Venture Holding acquired the team and terminate all the functions of it.

History

2008–09 season 

Driver: Adam Khan

The 2008–09 season saw wholesale changes not just at A1GP but within Team Pakistan. On September 10, 2008 Adam Khan was announced to hold the dual-role of race driver, and seat holder of A1 Team Pakistan for the 2008–09 season. replacing Arif Hussain who had successfully established A1 Team Pakistan. Team Craft took over the running of the team. The team has not yet participated in the season as Adam Khan is too big for the new Ferrari built chassis.

The chassis was eventually built ahead of Round 5 in Gauteng, however Khan did not race for undisclosed reasons. He did not race in Round 6 either due to a date clash with his ING Renault F1 Team demonstration driver duties, and did not compete in the final round.

2007–08 season 

Driver: Adam Khan

A1 Team Pakistan allowed Khan to choose the racing team who would manage the car but despite this he was unable to change the fortunes of the struggling team.  The team, selected by Khan, lacked the technical back up that other teams on the grid had, and were unable to do basics such as analysing lap data, holding Khan back. He was still able to pick up Team Pakistan's one and only point of the season when he finished 10th in the sprint race in New Zealand.

2006–07 season 

Driver: Nur B. Ali

Adam Khan left the team, and Nur Ali was recalled to race for Team Pakistan in their second season. Performance Racing took over the running of the team. Ali struggled throughout the season where he was off the pace in nearly every race, but he was able to capture a point when he finished 10th in South Africa in the feature race.

2005–06 season 

Drivers: Adam Khan, Enrico Toccacelo

The launch of A1 Team Pakistan was one of the most spectacular, with the A1 Grand Prix Car being presented in front of the Lahore Fort, a UNESCO World Heritage site. Pakistan's President Pervez Musharraf was the star guest at the event, hosted by A1 Team Pakistan Chairman Arif Hussain and its Managing Director, Chaudry Salik Hussain. The team was to be run by Super Nova Racing.

Nur B. Ali was the first driver to be named in A1GP and had shown good form during pre-season testing, but was replaced with British born Adam Khan.

The Season started well. In the first race at Brands Hatch, Adam Khan qualified in 7th place and finished the sprint race in 8th. The feature race saw problems in the pit stop and saw Khan finish in 13th. However, despite being managed by the highly successful Super Nova Racing, things went downhill from there and not a single point was scored, until South Africa where Khan crashed during practice forcing him out until the final rounds in China. Here he was able to finish 5th in the feature race which resulted in Pakistan scoring a total of 10 points.

Enrico Toccacelo drove in South Africa for Team Pakistan as the team has already spent much time preparing for the race, also the management wished to not disappoint the Pakistani fans.

Drivers 

1 Italian driver Enrico Toccacelo from A1 Team Italy, drove the Team Pakistan car in the 2005–06 South African race, after Adam Khan was injured during the practice sessions.

Complete A1 Grand Prix results 

(key), "spr" indicate a Sprint Race, "fea" indicate a Main Race.

(1) = Since Taupo, New Zealand round, January 2008

References

External links
A1gp.com Official A1 Grand Prix Web Site
A1teampak.com  Official A1 Team Pakistan Website
RacingPakistan.com | Official Racing Pakistan Web Site
New Pakistan A1 driver impresses in China

Pakistan A1 team
Motorsport in Pakistan
A
Auto racing teams established in 2005
Auto racing teams disestablished in 2008